Melik is a hereditary Armenian noble title, in various Eastern Armenian principalities known as melikdoms encompassing modern Yerevan, Kars, Nakhichevan, Sevan, Lori, Artsakh, Northwestern Persia and Syunik starting from the Late Middle Ages until the end of the nineteenth century.

Melik or Meliq may also refer to:

People

Title
Melik Mehmed Gazi (died 1142), the fourth ruler of Danishmendids
Melik Zünnun (died 1175), the fifth ruler of Danishmendids

Given name
Melik Brown (born 1984), U.S. football fullback
Melik Demirel, professor and researcher professor at Pennsylvania State University
Melik Janoyan (born 1985), Armenian athlete and javelin thrower
Melik Ohanian (born 1969), French contemporary artist of Armenian origin

Middle name
Alexander Melik-Pashayev (1905–1964), Soviet-Armenian conductor
Gevorg Melik-Karagyozyan, Armenian politician and minister
Hakob Melik-Hakobian, real name of Armenian novelist Raffi
Natalya Melik Melikyan (1906–1989), Armenian scientist

Surname
Anton Melik (1890–1966), Slovene geographer
Ioan Mire Melik, or Melic (1840–1889), Wallachian, later Romanian mathematician, educator and political figure
Rouben Melik (1921–2007), French-Armenian poet and a member of the French Resistance
Sayuti Melik (1908-1989), Indonesian typist of the copy of the proclamation of independence, which was proclaimed by Sukarno on August 17, 1945
Vasilij Melik (1921–2009), Slovenian historian

See also
Meliki, formerly Melik, a village and a former municipality in Imathia, Greece
Melikgyugh, meaning Melik village, a town in the Aragatsotn Province of Armenia
Musée Edgar Mélik, museum within the historic castle Château de Cabriès
Malach (disambiguation) / Malakh
Malak (disambiguation)
Malek (disambiguation)
Malik
Melek